Sunnie Percival Chan (born 4 February 1982) is a New Zealand cricketer who played first-class and List A cricket for Canterbury and Wellington between 2006 and 2010.

External links

1982 births
New Zealand cricketers
New Zealand people of Chinese descent
Canterbury cricketers
Wellington cricketers
Living people